Balice may refer to:

John Paul II International Airport Kraków–Balice, airport serving Kraków, Poland
Balice, Cuiavian-Pomeranian Voivodeship, Central Poland
Balice, Lesser Poland Voivodeship, south Poland
Balice, Świętokrzyskie Voivodeship, south-central Poland
Balychi, Lviv Oblast, western Ukraine